Studencheskaya may refer to:

 Studencheskaya (Moscow Metro)
 Studencheskaya (Kharkiv Metro)
 Studencheskaya (Novosibirsk Metro)
 Mount Studencheskaya, Bureya Range, Jewish Autonomous Oblast